Bucheon Philharmonic Orchestra is an orchestra based in Bucheon, South Korea. Since its foundation in 1988, it has continuously taken up new challenges, capturing the public's attention. Thanks to its performances and wide-ranging repertoire, the Orchestra has grown to become one of South Korea's best orchestras.

History 
Soon after its foundation, the Orchestra presented works by 20th century composers Schönberg and Bartók, and successfully performed a complete symphony series of Brahms and Beethoven. The Orchestra was invited to represent South Korea at the 1st Asia Orchestra Week held in Japan in 2002. It staged Berlioz’s Symphonie Fantastique, receiving favourable reviews from Japanese music audiences and the press. The Orchestra also performed at the Kawasaki Concert Hall, Smetana Hall in Prague, Herkulessaal in Munich, and Musikverein Golden Hall in Vienna.

The Orchestra is well known for its performances of the complete symphonies of Mahler. The Mahler Series, which lasted from 1999 to 2003, is considered a milestone in the history of Korean classical music and marked the start of a "Mahler Fever" in Korea. The efforts of the Orchestra have been recognized in the Korean arts scene and won it the Hoam Prize in Art, in 2005, becoming the first musical organization to do so and strengthening the orchestra's position.

The Bucheon Philharmonic Orchestra is currently preparing for a new future under the direction of maestro Young Min Park, who was appointed as the new conductor in 2015. The Bucheon Philharmonic Orchestra was the only Korean orchestra invited to the 2016 La Folle Journée, the largest classical music festival in France.

Under the new leadership of maestro Young Min Park, the Bucheon Philharmonic Orchestra will be presenting high-level musical programs including the ongoing "A Banquet for Wagner", "The Quest of R. Strauss Series" which searches for Richard Strauss’ work, the "Maestra ＆ Maestro series" through which the audience will encounter domestically and internationally famous conductors, and the "BPO Opera". The orchestra has also prepared diverse concert programs tailored to Bucheon residents, including "Guide Concert", "Youth Concert", "Family Concert", "Morning Classic Concert", "Kids Concert" as well as the "Visiting Concert" program, which brings the music directly to Bucheon residents and music fans.

External links
 Official Homepage (in English)

Musical groups established in 1988
South Korean orchestras